The Ill (all capitals: ILL) is a  tributary of the Rhine in the western Austrian state of Vorarlberg.

It flows from the northern slopes of the Silvretta mountain range and then runs north-west through Vorarlberg. The Ill passes through the Montafon and  valleys and the town Feldkirch. It joins the river Rhine a few kilometers northwest of Feldkirch ("Illspitz"), at the border with Switzerland. The Ill has several dams with hydroelectric power stations.

Rivers of Vorarlberg
Bregenz Forest Mountains
 
Verwall Alps
Silvretta Alps
Rivers of Austria